Hulodes drylla is a moth of the family Erebidae. It is found from India to Burma. The specimens of Hulodes drylla in Queensland are now considered to be Hulodes donata.

Both Hulodes saturnioides and Hulodes donata were thought to be synonyms of Hulodes drylla, but have been reinstated as species recently.

References

External links

Australian Caterpillars

Moths described in 1852
Hulodes